The Mercedes-Benz R107 and C107 are sports cars which were produced by Mercedes-Benz from 1971 until 1989, being the second longest single series ever produced by the automaker after the G-Class. They were sold under the SL (R107) and SLC (C107) model names as the 280 SL, 280 SLC, 300 SL, 350 SL, 350 SLC, 380 SL, 380 SLC, 420 SL, 450 SL, 450 SLC, 450 SLC 5.0, 500 SL, 500 SLC and 560 SL.

The R107/SL was a two-seat car with a detachable roof. It replaced the W113 SL-Class in 1971 and was replaced by the R129 SL-Class in 1989.

The predecessor W113 was notably successful in North America, with 19,440 units (40%) of 48,912 total units sold in the US. The R107 and C107 were even more focused on the American market, with specialized engines, bumper designs, headlights, and emissions management designs. The R107 and C107 sold 204,373 units in the US (68%) of 300,175 total units sold (excluding grey market sales into the US).

During its production run, the SL was the only roadster offered by Mercedes-Benz.

The C107/SLC was a four-seat car with a fixed roof and an optional sliding steel sunroof. It replaced the W111 Coupé in 1971 and was replaced by the C126 S-class coupe in 1981.

Model history
 The R107 and C107 took the chassis components of the midsize 1968 Mercedes-Benz W114 model and mated them initially to the M116 and M117 V8 engines used in the W108, W109 and W111 series. The body styles for both R107 and C107 did not change materially from introduction in 1971 to their end of production in 1981 (coupé) and 1989 (soft-top) respectively.

The SL (R107) variant was a 2-seat convertible/roadster with standard soft-top, with optional winter hardtop and only rarely ordered bench for the tiny rear cabin. 

The SLC (C107) derivative was a 2-door hardtop coupe with normal rear seats. The SLC is commonly referred to as an 'SL coupe', and it was the first and only time Mercedes-Benz based their S-class coupe on a stretched 2-seat SL roadster platform, rather than on a large S-class saloon, replacing the former saloon-based 280/300 SE coupé in Mercedes lineup. The SLC model run ended in 1981, much earlier than the SL, to be replaced with a much larger model, the 380SEC and 500SEC, again based on the new 1980 full-size S-class liner.

Volume production of the first R107 car, the 350 SL, started in April 1971 alongside the last of the W113 cars; the 350 SLC followed in October. The early 1971 350SL are very rare and were available with an optional 4 speed fluid coupling automatic gearbox. The 1971 4sp auto were quick cars for the day with 0-60 mph in 8 seconds. In addition, the rare 1971 cars were fitted with Bosch electronic fuel injection.

European models and engines

The 350SL and 350SLC for the European market used a 3.5 liter V8 engine.

From July 1974 both SL and SLC could also be ordered with a fuel-injected 2.8L straight-6 as 280 SL and SLC. 

In September 1977 the 450 SLC 5.0 joined the line. This was a homologation version of the big coupé, featuring a new all-aluminium five-liter V8, aluminium alloy bonnet and boot lid, as well as a black rubber rear spoiler and a small front lip spoiler. These changes resulted in a reduction in weight of over 100kg when compared to the 'old' 450 SLC. The '5.0' was built in  limited numbers, only 2,769 being completed between 1977 and 1981. Maximum speed of the '5.0' was some 10km/h faster than that of the '4.5' at around 225km/h. The 450 SLC 5.0 was produced in order to homologate the SLC for the 1978 World Rally Championship.

Starting in 1980, the 350, 450 and 450 SLC 5.0 models (like the 350 and 450 SL) were discontinued in 1980 with the introduction of the 380 and 500 SLC in March 1980. At the same time, the cars received a very mild makeover; the 3-speed automatic was replaced by a four-speed unit, returning to where the R107 started in 1971 with the optional 4 speed automatic 350SL (3.5lt).

The 280, 380 and 500 SLC were discontinued in 1981 with the introduction of the W126 series 380 and 500 SEC coupes. A total of 62,888 SLCs had been manufactured over a ten-year period of which just 1,636 were the 450 SLC-5.0 and 1,133 were the 500 SLC. Both these models are sought by collectors today. With the exception of the R171 SLK 55 AMG Black Series and the SL65 AMG Black Series, the SLC remains the only fixed roof Mercedes-Benz coupe based on a roadster rather than a saloon.

Following the discontinuation of the SLC in November 1981 the 107 series continued initially as the 280, 380 and 500 SL. At this time, the V8 engines were re-tuned for greater efficiency, lost a few horsepower and consumed less fuel, largely due to substantially higher (numerically lower) axle ratios that went from 3.27:1 to 2.47:1 for the 380 SL and from 2.72:1 to 2.27:1 for the 500 SL.

From September 1985 the 280 SL was replaced by a new 300 SL and the 380 SL by a 420 SL; the 500 SL continued and a 560 SL was introduced for certain extra-European markets, notably the USA, Australia and Japan.

Also in 1985, the Bosch KE Jetronic was fitted. The KE Jetronic system varied from the earlier, all mechanical system by the introduction of a more modern engine management "computer", which controlled idle speed, fuel rate, and air/fuel mixture. The final car of the 18 years running 107 series was a 500 SL painted Signal red, built on 4 August 1989; it currently resides in the Mercedes-Benz museum in Stuttgart, Germany.

North American models

North America was the key market for this Personal luxury car, and two thirds of R107 and C107 production was sold there.

The R107/C107 for the North American market sported four round low-output sealed beam headlights, due to unique U.S. regulations.

Sales in North America began in 1972, and cars wore the badge 350 SL, but actually had a larger 4.5L V8 with 3 speed auto (and were renamed 450 SL for model year 1973); the big V8 became available on other markets with the official introduction of the 450 SL/SLC on non-North American markets in March 1973. US cars sold from 1972 through 1975 used the Bosch D Jetronic fuel injection system, an early electronic engine management system.

R107 and C107 cars were exported to the US with low compression 4.5 liter V8 engines to meet stringent US emissions requirements, yet still provide adequate power.

US models sold from 1976 through 1979 used the Bosch K Jetronic system, an entirely mechanical fuel injection system.

The 450 SL was produced until 1980. Starting in 1980, US cars were equipped with lambda control, which varied the air/fuel mixture based on feedback from an oxygen sensor. The smaller engined 380 SL replaced the 450SL from 1981 to 1985. The Malaise era 380 SL was the least powerful of the US market R107 roadsters.

North American market SL and SLC models retained the "protruding" 5 mph bumpers, even after the wisdom of the law was reconsidered in 1981.

US gray market sales

The more powerful 500 SL with a 5.0 liter engine, produced from 1980–1989, was not available in the US. This drove many customers to obtain the European specification car in the "gray market." Finally, a more powerful version was available from the factory, from 1986 to 1989, the 560 SL. It was exclusive to the USA, European, Japanese and Australian markets.

Despite the larger 5.6 liter engine of the U.S. 560 SL, the forbidden Euro-spec 500 SL was the fastest production 107 produced (mostly because of the lack of emission restraints).

Mechanical troubles
Model years 1975 and 1976 450 SLs suffered from vapor lock and hard restart because of the under-bonnet position of the catalytic converter. Starting in MY 1977, the catalytic converter was moved to replace the resonator, located just behind the transmission in the exhaust system.

The 380SL/C engine came with a single row timing chain from 1981 through 1983.  These early 380 models were plagued with chain failure problems and the problem was corrected by Mercedes-Benz, free of charge. Some models, however, escaped retrofit and may at some point fail as a result.

MYs 1984 and 1985 came with a double row timing chain from the factory to address this issue.

Another problem area for late 450 SLs was the automatic climate control system. Based on a "servo," which controlled coolant flow to the heater core, as well as vacuum to actuate the vents in the interior of the car, the system proved unreliable. It was installed on 450 SLs through end of production in 1980. Models produced prior to 1978 had a manual climate control system, 380SL models produced from 1981 received a more reliable automatic climate control system.

South African assembly
Both the SL and SLC models were also assembled in South Africa by UCDD (United Car and Diesel Distributors) for the captive domestic market from early 1977 (on a contractor basis before Daimler-Benz A.G. acquired a majority stake of UCDD in 1984). Only about 40 units per month were built.

Technical data

Europe

North America

Models timeline

Motorsport

450 SLC 5.0 

In 1978 the factory prepared two examples for the one-off Vuelta a la América del Sur, a month-long event of some 7,000 kilometres in length that took the competitors from Buenos Aires and back via Rio, Manaus, Caracas, Bogota, Lima, La Paz, Santiago and Ushuaia. The car driven by Andrew Cowan and Colin Malkin won by 20 minutes from team-mates Sobiesław Zasada and Andrzej Zembrzuski. 

In 1979 a 5.0-litre 450 SLC driven by Hannu Mikkola won the Bandama Rally in Côte d'Ivoire, with others finishing 2nd, 3rd and 4th. That same year the factory had used the 450 SLC '5.0' to contest the Safari Rally, only narrowly missing out on victory because of suspension breakages. Nevertheless, the car driven by Hannu Mikkola finished 2nd. 

Results in 1980 were less good, and the factory team was disbanded at the season's end. An Albert Pfuhl proceeded to buy all six cars, equipment, and spare parts from the works team. Pfuhl and his team built a series of cars to compete in the 1984 Paris–Dakar Rally with a white and blue "BOSS" livery. The cars finished well down the order.

Appearance in media
The R107 was seen frequently on American television programs of the 1970s, like Dallas, The Six Million Dollar Man, Hart To Hart, Switch, The Rockford Files, and Wonder Woman.

The R107 plays a key role in Robert Altman's The Long Goodbye (film) (1973), where Philip Marlowe (Elliott Gould) tries to contact the elusive Eileen (Nina van Pallandt) driving away in her open 450SL, but he is hit by another car. 

In the 1980 movie American Gigolo, Richard Gere drives a black 1980 Mercedes-Benz 450 SL (R107). In a later disconcerting scene, Gere's character Julian Kaye rips the car apart in his apartment garage looking for a stash of jewels he believes planted in the car to frame him for the Rheiman murder.

A modified Mercedes R107 appeared in Season 1, Episode 9 (Berks to the Future) of the Amazon Prime Video original series The Grand Tour. It was used by Jeremy Clarkson, who was trying to create a new type of sports utility vehicle by combining the chassis and engine of a Land Rover Discovery with the bodies of classic sports cars. Originally he tried it with a 1978 MGB, which failed, so he used the Mercedes R107. The car was named as 'The Excellent' and Clarkson still owns it today.

See also
Mercedes-Benz SL-Class

References

Notes

Bibliography

External links

R107
R107
Roadsters
Convertibles
Coupés
Cars introduced in 1971
1980s cars
Rear-wheel-drive vehicles
Group 4 (racing) cars